Forss Water, known also as Forss River, has its source at the northern end of Loch Shurrey, at . Crosskirk Bay is on the north coast of Great Britain and about 8 kilometres west of the burgh of Thurso, Caithness, in Highland, Scotland.
The river marked the eastern extent of the Clan Mackay raid in the Sandside Chase of 1437.

Tributaries

Bridges

The river is crossed by four road bridges and one footbridge.

The road bridges are:
The A836 leads towards Thurso and John o' Groats in the east and towards Reay, Melvich, Bettyhill and Tongue in the west.

References

Rivers of Highland (council area)